Jewish identity is the objective or subjective state of perceiving oneself as a Jew and as relating to being Jewish. Under a broader definition, Jewish identity does not depend on whether a person is regarded as a Jew by others, or by an external set of religious, or legal, or sociological norms. Jewish identity does not need to imply religious orthodoxy. Accordingly, Jewish identity can be cultural in nature. Jewish identity can involve ties to the Jewish community. Orthodox Judaism bases Jewishness on matrilineal descent. According to Jewish law (halacha), all those born of a Jewish mother are considered Jewish, regardless of personal beliefs or level of observance of Jewish law. Progressive Judaism and Haymanot Judaism in general base Jewishness on having at least one Jewish parent, while Karaite Judaism bases Jewishness only on paternal lineage. These differences between the major Jewish movements are the source of the disagreement and debate about Who is a Jew?. 

Jews who are atheists or Jews who follow other religions (Christianity etc) may have a Jewish identity. While the absolute majority of people with this identity are of Jewish ethnicity, people of a mixed Jewish and non-Jewish background or gentiles of Jewish ancestry may still have a sense of Jewish self-identity.

Components
Jewish identity can be described as consisting of three interconnected parts:

Jewish peoplehood, an ethnic identity composed of several subdivisions that evolved in the Diaspora.
Jewish religion, observance of spiritual and ritual tenets of Judaism.
Jewish culture, celebration of traditions, secular and religious alike.

In ancient times 
In classical antiquity, the Jewish people were constantly identified by Greek, Roman, and Jewish authors as an ethnos, one of the several ethne living in the Greco-Roman world. Van Maaren utilizes the six attributes that co-ethnics share, as identified by Hutchinson and Smith, to show why ancient Jews may be considered an ethnic group in modern terminology. Those include:

 A common proper name that identifies and conveys the "essence" of its community. In antiquity, three proper names were used to refer to the Jewish ethnos, namely: "Hebrew", "Israel", and "Jews".
 A myth of common ancestry. In the Jewish case, of descent from eponymous ancestor Jacob/Israel; additionally, the putative descent from Abraham was used to expand definitions of Jewishness by the Hasmoneans and contested by others.
 Shared memories of the past, including historical events and heroes. Jewish sacred books' accounts of historical events serve as a basic collection of those. Stories and figures narrated in the Hebrew Bible and other writings were further ingrained in the collective Jewish identity by the community reading of these books in synagogues. That includes figures such as the Patriarchs, Moses and David, and events including the Exodus, the covenant at Mount Sinai, the heyday of the united monarchy, the Babylonian captivity, the Antiochene persecutions, and the Maccabean revolt.
 One or more aspects of common culture, which are not necessitated to be specified, but typically include religion, language, and customs. There were significant overlaps between the religion, languages, customs, and other cultural aspects shared by ancient Jews; moreover, religion cannot be separated from other cultural aspects, especially in ancient times. The worship of the God of Israel, the work of the cult at Jerusalem and other cultic sites, and the following of particular Jewish customs (dietary laws, Sabbath observance, etc.) were major aspects of Jewishness at the period. Despite the fact that not all Jews spoke the same language, because many of the sacred writings were written in Hebrew, it also served as a symbol for Jews who did not speak the language.
 A connection to a homeland, which need not be physically occupied by the ethnic group in order for it to have symbolic attachment to the place of origin, as is the case for diaspora populations. In the Jewish case, this is the Land of Israel, or Judaea/Palaestina. For both the local Jews and those residing abroad, the land held symbolic value. It endures, despite the Land's borders frequently shifting and occasionally disappearing throughout time.
 A sense of solidary on the part of at least some sections of the ethnic population. The strength of this sentiment varies. Josephus reports that when the First Jewish-Roman War broke out, the Jews of Scythopolis joined the city in fighting the Jewish rebels because they had weaker sense of solidarity for the Jewish ethnos.
In his works from the late Second Temple period, Philo of Alexandria made comments that reflected the features of Jewish identity in the diaspora. At the time Philo lived, Jews had been present in the Diaspora, particularly in Alexandria, for a very long time. Because his fellow nationals had lived there for many generations, he appears to have thought of Alexandria as his city. In an effort to explain the status of the Jews in words that Greek readers would understand, Philo depicted them as immigrants who laid the groundwork for "colonies" (Greek: apoikiai), with Jerusalem serving as their "mother-city" (metropolis). According to Kasher, Alexandria in this circumstance could only be regarded as a homeland in the political sense because it was the site of the establishment of a Jewish "colony," structured as a distinct ethnic union with a recognized political and legal status (politeuma), with Jerusalem being the colony's mother-city.

A cultural/ancestral concept
Jewish identity can be cultural, religious, or through ancestry. There are religious, cultural, and ancestral components to Jewish identity due to its fundamental non-proselytizing nature, as opposed to Christian or Muslim identity which are both "universal" religions in that they ascribe to the notion that their faith is meant to be spread throughout all of humanity, regardless of nationality. However, Jewish identity is firmly intertwined with Jewish ancestry dating back to the historical Kingdom of Israel, which was largely depopulated by the Roman Empire c. first century CE, leading to what is known as today as the Jewish Diaspora.

In contemporary sociology

Jewish identity began to gain the attention of Jewish sociologists in the United States with the publication of Marshall Sklare's "Lakeville studies". Among other topics explored in the studies was Sklare's notion of a "good Jew". The "good Jew" was essentially an idealized form of Jewish identity as expressed by the Lakeville respondents. Today, sociological measurements of Jewish identity have become the concern of the Jewish Federations who have sponsored numerous community studies across the U.S.; policy decisions (in areas such as funding, programming, etc.) have been shaped in part due to studies on Jewish identity.

Antisemitism and Jewish identity
According to the social-psychologist Simon Herman, antisemitism plays a part in shaping Jewish identity. This view is echoed by religious leaders such as Rabbi Jonathan Sacks who writes that modern Jewish communities and the modern Jewish identity are deeply influenced by antisemitism.

Right-wing antisemitism, for example, is typically a branch of white supremacy: it traditionally conceives of Jews as a distinct race with intrinsic, undesirable qualities that must be exterminated from the population. Left-wing antisemitism, by contrast, frequently views Jews as members of the white race, an idea that is a precursor to the criticism of Zionism as a racist ideology, as well as the exclusion of Jews from goals of intersectionality.

As Blake Flayton, a columnist at The Jewish Journal, wrote in The New York Times in 2019:

"We often refrain from calling out anti-Semitism on our side for fear of our political bona fides being questioned or, worse, losing friends or being smeared as the things we most revile: racist, white supremacist, colonialist and so on. And that is exactly what happens when we do speak up...While white supremacists plot to murder Jews across this country, 'anti-Zionists' on college campuses seek to marginalize us as white supremacists."

See also

References

External links
Leadel.NET - Leading Jewish Inspiration. What makes Jewish Identity on the web?

 HERMAN, Simon N. Jewish Identity: A Social Psychological Perspective. Transaction, 1977.
 GOLDBERG, David Theo & KRAUSZ, Michael. Jewish Identity.  Temple University Press, 1993.
 Half-jewish

 Three Intellectuals and a People, by Laurent Cohen (an article about the Jewish Identity of Hannah Arendt, Gershom Scholem and Simone Weil). Eretz Acheret,  5 November 2009.

Identity politics
Religious identity
Secular Jewish culture
Jewish society
Jewish culture
Judaism-related controversies
Collective identity